Gareth Cloete (born October 13, 1978) was a Namibian cricketer. He played with the Namibian under-19s cricket team at the Under-19s Cricket World Cup in 1998. He was generally used as a lower-order batsman, generally ninth or tenth within the Namibian batting lineup, as well as being used as an attacking bowler in partnership with Rudi Scholtz.

In 2007, Cloete made his debut for the Namibia A side, nearly ten years after his only previous involvement with the team, during a tour by Canada - however, he made no impact on the game, neither with the bat or ball. Cloete's debut first-class appearance came in the South African Airways Provincial Challenge against Griqualand West in November 2007. After his playing career, Gareth Cloete started his coaching career with the WHS the Windhoek Old Boys club in Windhoek winning multiple titles. He also coached the Namibian Women’s team.

External links 
 Gareth Cloete at Cricket Archive 

1978 births
Living people
Namibian cricketers
Namibian people of South African descent
Place of birth missing (living people)